The Zuid ("South") in Antwerp is a currently fashionable area of Antwerp. Revived in the mid-1980s, it has an attractive street plan and a few Art Nouveau buildings, such as the former Volkshuis (or Maison du Peuple) on the Volkstraat, but which now houses the Rudolf Steiner school. Three museums, numerous commercial art galleries, fashionable cafes and restaurants, two arts' centres and a sprinkling of up-market shops add to the attractions of the area.

History 

Antwerpen Zuid (Antwerp South) came into being as a distinct neighborhood with the demolition of Antwerp Citadel, known locally as the Zuidkasteel, which had originally been built by the Spanish. Demolition works were started in 1874. The street plan was approved by Royal Decree in 1875. It is said to have been inspired by Haussman, giving rise to the nickname "Le Petit Paris". Work was started on the excavation of the Zuiderdokken (Southern Docks) in the same year. The area was developed over the next 25 years, with most of the major public buildings being completed in the final decade of the century. Landmarks in the history of the area include:

 two World Fairs, held respectively in 1885 and 1894 (see list of world's fairs);
 the completion of the Royal Museum of Fine Arts in 1890;
 the completion of the "Dutch" Synagogue in the Bouwmeestersstraat in 1893 (see History of the Jews in Antwerp);
 the opening of the Parein biscuit factory in the Brusselsestraat in 1894;
 the completion of the St. Michiels church (Amerikalei) in 1897; 
 the completion of the buildings of the State Commercial College (Handelshogeschool) (Schildersstraat) likewise in 1897. It now houses a nursery school after being the home of the Higher Institute for Translators and Interpreters for 53 years;
 the opening of the South Station in 1898;

The Petit Paris cachet, the agreeable street plan, its monuments and cultural attractions made "het Zuid" or "Le Midi" a fashionable place to live until the Second World War. During the war the area sustained considerable V bomb damage, with the first bomb to hit Antwerp landing on the corner of the Schildersstraat and the Leopold De Waelplaats.

After the war the area went into a long period of decline. Probable reasons include the flight to the suburbs, the decline of the Southern Docks, and the closure of the South Station, with the latter being demolished in 1965.

The low rents made the area attractive to both immigrants and those seeking a bohemian lifestyle. The rock bottom prices, for example, made it possible for Anny De Dekker to open the "Wide White Space Gallery" (1966–1976) on the ground floor of Het Bootje, an architecturally eclectic house on the corner of Schildersstraat and Plaatsnijdersstraat, and now a listed monument.

The Southern Docks were filled in 1968 and 1969, and became parking space. A new building for the Court of Appeals was built on the former access to these docks. This and the demolition of the Hippodrome in 1972 sealed the fate of "het Zuid" as a forgotten area of town with only a certain faded charm to offer.

Eventually the fundamentally good quality of the housing stock combined with the area's inherent attractions, changing attitudes toward urban living, and the impetus provided by International Rubens year in 1977, which brought hundreds of visitors to South Antwerp, led to a revival in fortunes.

Museums 

Royal Museum of Fine Arts
The building dates from 1890 and was constructed specifically to house the city's growing collection of art. The collection includes many Dutch and Belgian masterpieces from the 15th century onwards by artists such as Jan van Eyck, Rogier van der Weyden, Rembrandt and Rubens as well as several works by Ensor, Magritte and Delvaux.  
Museum van Hedendaagse Kunst Antwerpen
This is the contemporary art museum of the city and one of the largest of its kind in Belgium. The museum holds a permanent collection of contemporary art by Belgian and international artists, a cinema and a specialized library.
The architect responsible for the transformation of a former grainstore into a museum in (1987) was Michel Grandsard. He also designed the museum's new wing (1997). Since 1992 the director of the museum has been Bart de Baere.
Fotomuseum
This museum has a historical and contemporary collection of photography that is given a new presentation every year. Alongside the collection are frequently changing photography exhibitions, film projections and lectures. It also publishes a magazine "FMM" in Dutch, that presents articles on photography with a particular emphasis on fine art photography. The museum opened in 2004.

Monuments 

Several of the area's squares are graced with public monuments. These include a statue on the Marnixplaats, a fountain on the Lambermontplaats, and a statue on the Baron Dhanislei. Of more general interest, however, is the "Waterpoort" (Water Gate), based on a design by Rubens, and which stands on the Sint-Gillisplaats.

On 6 July 2012 a new statue of William of Orange (William the Silent) and Marnix of Sint-Aldegondis was inaugurated in the gardens of the Royal Museum of Fine Arts. The statue is surrounded by a number of stelae commemorating key conflicts leading to the Thirty Years' War. 
The monument stands on or close to what was once the stronghold defended by both men against the Spanish aggressors.

Arts Centres 

In 1987 the left-leaning theatre company "De Internationale Nieuwe Scene" moved into the derelict "Zuiderpershuis". Since then this former hydraulic power station for the lock gates of the Zuiderdokken has become an important centre for the arts.

As its name might suggest De Monty was formerly a local cinema and parish hall. It is now a venue for numerous travelling companies and groups of all kinds.

't Raamtheater shared part of the large complex of buildings occupied by the Hoger Instituut van Vertalers en Tolken, the language department of Hogeschool Antwerpen, now Artesia.

Innovation, business and new development 

Once the Southern Docks fell into disuse (see above) the attraction of the area as a location for industrial and semi-industrial activities declined. This combined with strict zoning laws resulted in virtually all the many small workshops and warehousing operations around the docks and elsewhere in the area having to shut down or relocate.

Apart from existing attractions such as the inherently good housing stock and agreeable street plan, an important factor in reestablishing the elan of the neighborhood has been the availability of land for development. This has come from the demolition or conversion of industrial and semi-industrial buildings, the abandonment and/or redevelopment of buildings such as the former Hippodrome, and the demolition of the South Station. The derelict marshalling yards on the southern edge of the neighborhood are being developed into a sustainable development called Circulair Zuid including 2,200 homes between 2018 and 2030.

At present the area is served by a single supermarket on the ground floor of the redeveloped Hippodrome site.   
The most spectacular new development so far though is the new Palace of Justice (law courts) complex on the former South Station site. This award-winning project, designed by the Richard Rogers Partnership in association with VKStudio and Ove Arup & Partners, opened in 2007.

The presence of this new complex has encouraged lawyers, and various support services to seek premises nearby.  
Finally, a number of IT start-ups have been attracted by the area's fashionable image in recent years.  Whether the trading atmosphere will prove to be congenial in the longer term remains to be seen.

References

External links
For a full timeline of Antwerp's history in Dutch. This site also includes an extensive photographic library of contemporary Antwerp.
The website of the Buildings Agency (Regie der gebouwen) provides several pictures of the new Law Courts and project details in Dutch and French. 
Zuid.be - Zuid Online A commercial site listing a number of businesses and cultural activities in the area. The site also includes an image gallery, a city plan and useful links.

Geography of Antwerp
Populated places in Antwerp Province